Diphenylethylene or Diphenylethene may refer to:

 1,1-Diphenylethylene
 1,2-Diphenylethylene, or Stilbene
 (E)-Stilbene (trans-isomer)
 (Z)-Stilbene (cis-isomer)

See also
 Stilbenoids